The 7455th Tactical Intelligence Wing is an inactive United States Air Force unit.  It was last assigned to the United States Air Forces in Europe, stationed at Ramstein Air Base, Germany.  The unit was inactivated on 1 July 1992.

The wing was activated to provide HQ USAFE with centralized command and control for a variety of intelligence units in Europe.  The Wing Commander was dual hatted as the HQ USAFE Deputy Chief of Staff, Intelligence.  The last commander of the 7455th TIW was Brigadier General Charles L. Bishop. 

It was established on 1 September 1985, and inactivated on 1 July 1992

Assignments
 United States Air Forces in Europe, 1 September 1985 – 1 July 1992.

Components
 497th Reconnaissance Technical Group, Schierstein Kaserne, Wiesbaden
 496th Reconnaissance Technical Squadron, RAF Alconbury
 7450th Tactical Intelligence Squadron, Ramstein AB
 7451st Tactical Intelligence Squadron, Wueschheim AS
 7453d Tactical Electronics Squadron, Lindsey AS
 7454th Tactical Intelligence Squadron, Boerfink MTK
 7456th Tactical Intelligence Squadron, Ramstein AB
 7542d Tactical Electronics Squadron, Ramstein AB

Stations
 Ramstein AB, West Germany, 1 September 1985 – 1 July 1992

References

Military units and formations established in 1985
Military units and formations disestablished in 1992
Intelligence wings of the United States Air Force
Four Digit Wings of the United States Air Force
1985 establishments in the United States